The Abraham Ditto House, at 204 Elm St. in West Point, Kentucky, is a historic  house built in 1823.  It was listed on the National Register of Historic Places in 1988.

It is a two-story brick house with simple Federal-style detailing, with brick laid in Flemish bond.  It has an interior end brick chimney.  Its front includes a c.1890 glass and frame door with a single-light transom. The interior includes original Federal-style fluted mantles.

It was deemed "notable for its role in the commercial history of West Point. The building was constructed in 1823 for Abraham Ditto as an inn for river travellers. It is the one of the oldest buildings remaining in West Point and operated as the Ditto House in the mid-1800s. It was later known as the Riverview House before closing ca. 1870."

See also 
 Ditto-Prewitt House
 National Register of Historic Places listings in Hardin County, Kentucky

References

Houses on the National Register of Historic Places in Kentucky
Federal architecture in Kentucky
Houses completed in 1823
National Register of Historic Places in Hardin County, Kentucky
1823 establishments in Kentucky
Hotel buildings on the National Register of Historic Places in Kentucky
Individually listed contributing properties to historic districts on the National Register in Kentucky
Houses in Hardin County, Kentucky